That Lady is a 1955 British-Spanish historical romantic drama film directed by Terence Young and produced by Sy Bartlett and Ray Kinnoch. It stars Olivia de Havilland, Gilbert Roland, and Paul Scofield.

The film is based on a 1946 historical novel by Kate O'Brien, which was published in North America under the title For One Sweet Grape. It is the story of  Ana de Mendoza, a swashbuckling, sword-toting princess. She lost an eye in a duel defending the honour of her king Philip II of Spain, (played by Paul Scofield in his film debut, who earned a BAFTA award for best newcomer). Philip later jilted Ana to marry Mary I, the Queen of England, marrying her off to an aging noble, who died, leaving her a widow. Subsequently, he asks Ana de Mendoza to assist him in tutoring commoner Antonio Perez (Gilbert Roland) as his first secretary, but when they fall in love his popularity starts to drop, helped along by Philip II's jealous minister Mateo Vasquez (Dennis Price).

Shot in England and on location in Spain, the film features Cinemascope footage of the Spanish countryside and renaissance castles. That Lady was an early directorial effort by Terence Young, who went on to direct three James Bond films: Dr. No, From Russia With Love, and Thunderball. Christopher Lee appears in a minor role as the Captain of the Guard.

The novel was also produced as a play in 1949, starring Katharine Cornell as Ana, Henry Daniell as Philip II, and Torin Thatcher as Antonio.

Production

Director Terence Young had tried to interest Greta Garbo in starring in this film, without success. Vivien Leigh was interested, but due to her declining health and tuberculosis, it was impossible to insure her. Olivia de Havilland was the third choice for the film.

Much of the film was shot on location in Segovia, Spain.

Cast
Olivia de Havilland as Ana de Mendoza
Gilbert Roland as Antonio Perez
Paul Scofield as King Philip II of Spain
Françoise Rosay as Bernardine
Dennis Price as Mateo Vasquez
Anthony Dawson as Don Inigo
Robert Harris as Cardinal
Peter Illing as Diego
José Nieto as Don Juan de Escobedo
Christopher Lee as Captain
Ángel Peralta as Rejoneador
Fernando Sancho as Diego
Andy Shine as Little Fernando

References

External links

1955 films
Spanish drama films
English-language Spanish films
1950s English-language films
1955 romantic drama films
CinemaScope films
Films set in the 16th century
Films directed by Terence Young
British romantic drama films
1950s historical romance films
British historical romance films
Cultural depictions of Ana de Mendoza y de Silva, Princess of Éboli
1950s British films